Ginevra d'Este (24 March 1419 - 12 October 1440) was an Italian noblewoman. She and her twin sister Lucia (died 1437) were daughters of Niccolò III d'Este and his second wife Parisina Malatesta - they also had a younger brother, who died aged a few months. She was the first of Sigismondo Pandolfo Malatesta's three wives.

Life
Her mother was accused of infidelity with Ugo d'Este, Ginevra's half-brother and he and Parisina were condemned to death by Niccolò when Ginevra was aged six. Five years later Niccolò remarried to Ricciarda di Saluzzo, giving Ginevra two other half-brothers (Ercole and Sigismondo), in addition to her father's other illegitimate children.

She married Sigismondo Pandolfo Malatesta, lord of Rimini, in Rimini in February 1434. On her death in 1440 she was buried in the Tempio Malatestiano. In 1461 Pope Pius II accused Pandolfo of several crimes, including killing Ginevra, and excommunicated him.

References

Ginevra
1419 births
1440 deaths
Sigismondo Pandolfo Malatesta
15th-century Italian women
Burials at Tempio Malatestiano